Katra is a locality/township of Allahabad, Uttar Pradesh, India. It is one of the major markets of Allahabad city and is located in the Allahabad-02 region of the city. The market is divided into 4 lanes from Netram crossing- Old Katra, New Katra & Katra Extension. The nearby area,New Katra, is a residential area and houses some of the wealthy of the city.

References 

Neighbourhoods in Allahabad